As of 2021, following four consecutive failed rainy seasons, over 2.3 million people are facing food shortages in Somalia. Over 80% of the country is suffering a severe drought. In affected areas up to 20% of the population have experienced shortages of water, food and pasture, which have displaced an estimated 100,000 people.

Causes 
Climate change is a major cause with climate related hazards on the increase.

Impact 

 Most agricultural areas are expected to suffer crop failure, and there is little prospect of cereal production during the Deyr season.
 Particularly in central regions and in Puntland, communities are relying on boreholes as most shallow wells and berkads have dried up,
 The water levels of Shabelle and Juba rivers are low and expected to decrease.

Humanitarian situation 
71% of people in Somalia are living beneath the poverty threshold. The number of people requiring assistance is predicted to rise in 2022 to about 7.7 million from 5.9 million. By December 2021 a similar situation to the 2017 Somali drought is expected.

As of November 2021;

 5.9M are in need of humanitarian assistance.
 3.5M people are facing acute food insecurity
 2.9M displaced people
 1.2M of children are malnourished

Calls for response 
In November 2021, UN resident and humanitarian coordinator for Somalia, Adam Abdelmoula, called for urgent action, as the United Nations warned that the situation may become extreme by April 2022.

In November 2021 the Somali Humanitarian Response Plan for 2021 is 66% funded.

Response 
The Somali Humanitarian Fund has allocated $6 million and the UN Emergency Rosponse Fund has allocated $8 million toward relief efforts.

See also 

 2017 Somali drought
 Food security
 Water security
 2020-2023 Horn of Africa Drought

References 

2021 natural disasters
Natural disasters in Somalia
2021 in Somalia
2021 droughts
Drought in Somalia
2021 disasters in Somalia